Melu Kolupu ( Awakening) is a 1978 Telugu-language drama film, produced by A. Pundarikakshaiah under the Sri Bhaskara Chitra and directed by B. V. Prasad. It stars  N. T. Rama Rao, Jaya Prada, K. R. Vijaya  and music composed by Master Venu. The film is a remake of the Hindi movie Jagriti (1977).

Plot
The film begins with two petty thieves Dayanidhi & Parabrahmam acquitting from prison. Soon, they wear the mask of hypocritical social workers and forge as honorable. Plus, they perpetrate many activities such as exploiting orphan children as criminals, and women trafficking under the umbra of social welfare. Ramu & Chitti Babu are a few of them. Once, Ramu is acquainted with a court dancer Susheela who doesn’t have any taint. Ramu gets affectionate towards her and takes care of her as his sister. The Govt. appoints a special CID Officer Shekar to bar these scandals. Once, Ramu is caught and sent to a Juvenile home where he reforms under the guidance of Principal Shanti Devi. Meanwhile, Shekar is behind Dayanidhi & Brahmam and waiting for a shot to seize them. Amid of sentence, Ramu gets out to meet Susheela when Shekar is behind him and is surprised to spot Susheela as she is his past love. As of now, Shekar wholeheartedly accepts Susheela and relives her prison. Parallelly, Ramu releases and aims to straighten the remaining. So, he reenters and imparts their activities to Shekar. Moreover, he succeeds in transforming the remaining and enacts them as good citizens. Simultaneously, Dayanidhi's racket is about to collapse, so, he abducts Susheela to withhold Shekar. Finally, the movie ends with Shekar ceasing Dayanidhi with the aid of Ramu & Shanti Devi.

Cast
N. T. Rama Rao as Shekar
Jaya Prada as Susheela
K. R. Vijaya as Shanti Devi 
Nagabhushanam as Dayanidhi
Prabhakar Reddy as Parabrahmam
Padmanabham as Master 
Chalam as Chitti Babu
Jaya Bhaskar as Doctor  
Jaya Malini as item number
Halam as item number
Master Raja Krishna as Ramu

Soundtrack

Music composed by Master Venu.

References

Indian drama films
Telugu remakes of Hindi films